Melia azedarach, commonly known as the chinaberry tree, pride of India, bead-tree, Cape lilac, syringa berrytree, Persian lilac,  Indian lilac, or white cedar, is a species of deciduous tree in the mahogany family, Meliaceae, that is native to Indomalaya and Australasia.

Description 

The flowers are small and fragrant, with five pale purple or lilac petals, growing in clusters.

The fruit is a drupe, marble-sized, light yellow at maturity, hanging on the tree all winter, and gradually becoming wrinkled and almost white.

Chemistry 
Italo et al 2009 and Safithri and Sari 2016 report flavonoids and phenols found in M. azedarach.

Etymology 
The species azedarach is from the French 'azédarac' which in turn is from the Persian 'āzād dirakht' (ازادرخت ) meaning 'free- or noble tree'.

Melia azedarach should not be confused with the Azadirachta trees, which are in the same family, but a different genus.

Ecology 

Some hummingbirds like the sapphire-spangled emerald (Amazilia lactea), glittering-bellied emerald (Chlorostilbon lucidus) and planalto hermit (Phaethornis pretrei) have been recorded as feeding on and pollinating the flowers; these only take it opportunistically.

As an invasive species 

The plant was introduced around 1830 as an ornamental in the United States (South Carolina and Georgia) and widely planted in southern states. Today it is considered an invasive species by some groups as far north as Virginia and Oklahoma. But nurseries continue to sell the trees, and seeds are also widely available. It has become naturalized to tropical and warm temperate regions of the Americas and is planted in similar climates around the world. Besides the problem of toxicity, its usefulness as a shade tree in the United States is diminished by its tendency to sprout where unwanted and to turn sidewalks into dangerously slippery surfaces when the fruits fall, though this is not a problem where songbird populations are in good shape. As noted above, the possibility of commercially profitable harvesting of feral stands remains largely unexplored.

Toxicity 
The fruits have evolved to be eaten by animals which eat the flesh surrounding the hard endocarp or ingest the entire fruit and later vent the endocarp. If the endocarp is crushed or damaged during ingestion or digestion, the animal will be exposed to the toxins within the seed. The processes of mastication and digestion, and the degree of immunity to the particular toxins, vary widely between species, and there will accordingly be a great variation in the clinical symptoms following ingestion.

Fruits are poisonous or narcotic to humans if eaten in quantity. However, like those of the yew tree, these toxins are not harmful to birds, who gorge themselves on the fruit, eventually reaching a "drunken" state. The birds that are able to eat the fruit spread the seeds in their droppings. The toxins are neurotoxins and unidentified resins, found mainly in the fruits.  The first symptoms of poisoning appear a few hours after ingestion. They may include loss of appetite, vomiting, constipation or diarrhea, bloody faeces, stomach pain, pulmonary congestion, cardiac arrest, rigidity, lack of coordination and general weakness. Death may take place after about 24 hours. Like in relatives, tetranortriterpenoids constitute an important toxic principle. These are chemically related to azadirachtin, the primary insecticidal compound in the commercially important neem oil. These compounds are probably related to the wood and seed's resistance to pest infestation, and maybe to the unattractiveness of the flowers to animals.

The plant is toxic to cats.

Uses 

The main utility of chinaberry is its timber. This is of medium density, and ranges in colour from light brown to dark red. In appearance it is readily confused with the unrelated Burmese teak (Tectona grandis). Melia azedarach – in keeping with other members of the family Meliaceae – has a timber of high quality, but as opposed to many almost-extinct species of mahogany, it is under-utilised. Seasoning is relatively simple, in that planks dry without cracking or warping and are resistant to fungal infection. The taste of the leaves is not as bitter as neem (Azadirachta indica).

The tough five-grooved seeds were widely used for making rosaries and other products requiring beads; however, the seeds were later replaced by plastics. The cut branches with mature fruit are sold commercially to the florist and landscaping trade particularly as a component for outdoor holiday décor. The fruits may persist for some time prior to shattering off the stem or discoloring, which occurs rapidly after a relatively short time in subfreezing weather.

In Kenya the trees have been grown by farmers and used as fodder trees. The leaves can be fed to cattle to improve milk yields and improve farm incomes.

In Australia, particularly the suburbs of Melbourne, the tree is often used in nature strip plantings by local councils. The councils plant such trees for amenity reasons as well as environmental, social and economic benefits.

Leaves have been used as a natural insecticide to keep with stored food, but must not be eaten as they are highly poisonous. Chinaberry fruit was used to prevent insect larvae from growing in the fruit. By placing the berries in drying apples (etc.) and keeping the fruit turned in the sun without damaging any of the chinaberry skin, the fruit will dry and not have insect larvae in the dried apples.

A diluted infusion of leaves and trees has been used in the past to induce uterus relaxation.

References

Sources 
 [arolus] (1753): Species Plantarum 1: 384–385. Tropicos - Missouri Botanical Garden, Saint Louis, Missouri.
  (2005): Beija-flores (Aves, Trochilidae) e seus recursos florais em uma área urbana do Sul do Brasil  [Hummingbirds (Aves, Trochilidae) and their flowers in an urban area of southern Brazil]. [Portuguese with English abstract] Revista Brasileira de Zoologia 22(1): 51–59.  PDF fulltext.
  (2005): "Melia azedarach". In: Identification and Biology of Non-Native Plants in Florida's Natural Areas: 96–97. Version of 2005-SEP-05. PDF fulltext.
  (1997): "Melia azedarach". In: Poisonous Plants of North Carolina. Retrieved 2008-JAN-26.

External links 

 Melia azederach (PDF)
 SerTox: FAQ about toxic plants 
 

azedarach
Drought-tolerant trees
Flora of tropical Asia
Flora of New South Wales
Flora of Queensland
Garden plants of Asia
Garden plants of Australia
Introduced plants of South America
Naturalized trees of Alabama
Ornamental trees
Plants described in 1753
Poisonous plants
Sapindales of Australia
Taxa named by Carl Linnaeus
Trees of China
Trees of Oceania